Scaeosopha sinevi is a species of moth of the family Cosmopterigidae. It is found in China and Korea.

The wingspan is 17–19 mm.

The larvae have been recorded feeding on Gardenia jasminoides.

References

Moths described in 1997
Scaeosophinae